Musigati is a town in the Commune of Musigati in Bubanza Province in north western Burundi.

It is the seat of the Commune of Musigati. To the east is the Kibira National Park.

References

External links
Satellite map at Maplandia.com

Populated places in Burundi
Bubanza Province

nl:Musigati
sv:Musigati